The arrondissement of Thionville-Ouest is a former arrondissement of France in the Moselle department in the Lorraine region. In 2015 it was merged into the new arrondissement of Thionville. It had 30 communes, and its population was 121,927 (2012).

Composition

The communes of the arrondissement of Thionville-Ouest, and their INSEE codes, were:

History

The arrondissement of Thionville-Ouest was created in 1919. It was disbanded in 2015. As a result of the reorganisation of the cantons of France which came into effect in 2015, the borders of the cantons are no longer related to the borders of the arrondissements. The cantons of the arrondissement of Thionville-Ouest were, as of January 2015:
 Algrange
 Fameck
 Florange
 Fontoy
 Hayange
 Moyeuvre-Grande

References

Thionville-Ouest